Patrick John O'Reilly (died 16 July 1965) was an Irish politician. He was elected to Seanad Éireann by the Cultural and Educational Panel at 1944 Seanad election. He did not contest the 1948 Seanad election. He was the chief executive officer of Cavan Vocational Education Committee.

References

Year of birth missing
1965 deaths
Members of the 5th Seanad
Politicians from County Cavan
Independent members of Seanad Éireann